Open Mind may refer to:
 Open Mind (album), by Jean-Luc Ponty
 Open Mind (horse), an American Thoroughbred
 The Open Mind (band), a British psychedelic rock group
 The Open Mind (TV series), a public affairs talk show
 Open Mind Common Sense, an artificial intelligence project
 Open Mind Productions, a British television production company
 Open-mindedness, the psychological concept
 Monsieur Ouine, a novel by Georges Bernanos, known as The Open Mind in one translation
 Open Mind (journal), a cognitive science journal